The Karringmelk Spruit (literally "Buttermilk Spruit") is a tributary of the Kraai River in the Senqu area in the northeastern part of the Eastern Cape.

The river is crossed by a historical railway line (at ), and the Jan Kemp Vorster Bridge (1973) carries car traffic over the river in the direction of Barkly East, about 50 km away.

Etymology of Karringmelk 
The Dutch name "karnmelk" means buttermilk, the slightly sour liquid left after butter has been churned, used in baking or consumed as a drink.

See also 
 List of rivers of South Africa
 List of reservoirs and dams in South Africa

External links 
 Google Map of Karnmelk Spruit's mouth at Geonames.org (cc-by); post updated 2020-01-28; database download on 2017-02-28

Rivers of the Eastern Cape